Louis Shapiro may refer to:
 Louis Shapiro (communist)
 Louis Shapiro (judge)
 Louis Shapiro (mathematician)